Katarzyna Marszał (born 18 June 1985) is a Polish para table tennis player who plays in international level events. She has won team event titles with Natalia Partyka and Karolina Pęk.

References

1985 births
Living people
Sportspeople from Warsaw
Paralympic table tennis players of Poland
Table tennis players at the 2012 Summer Paralympics
Table tennis players at the 2016 Summer Paralympics
Medalists at the 2016 Summer Paralympics
Paralympic medalists in table tennis
Paralympic gold medalists for Poland
Polish female table tennis players